Rafferty Stadium is a 3,500-seat lacrosse stadium on the campus of Fairfield University in Fairfield, Connecticut. It is home to the Fairfield Stags men's and women's lacrosse teams. The facility opened officially on February 2, 2015. The stadium is named in recognition of the principal leadership gift from university alumnus Larry Rafferty. The field of the stadium in named Conway Field in acknowledgment of a gift from Tim Conway, another alumnus.

Facility overview

Rafferty Stadium features a Daktronics HD video board and state-of-the-art sound and lights.  Conway Field is a FieldTurf playing surface. The stadium also includes a terrace level with a fully enclosed press box that features a large media suite, two VIP suites and a production suite to support the video capabilities of the scoreboard, television broadcasts and web streaming. On the ground level are two team rooms, food, beverage and apparel concessions, restrooms, a box office and entry plaza.

The Rafferty Stadium President's Suite is home to an original painting by renowned American sports artist Stephen Holland.

Notable events
 On March 21, 2015, Fairfield University President Jeffrey P. von Arx S.J. officially dedicated and blessed Rafferty Stadium and Conway Field while the women's lacrosse team defeated the Manhattan Jaspers and the men's lacrosse team defeated the then nationally ranked Villanova Wildcats.
 In April 2015, the Colonial Athletic Association (CAA) played its 2015 Men's Lacrosse Championship at Rafferty Stadium after the Fairfield Stags won the CAA regular season title during its inaugural season in the league.

Professional Lacrosse
 In August 2016, three former Stags competed in the first-ever professional sporting event at Rafferty Stadium. Men's lacrosse standouts Greg Downing ‘07, Mike Bocklet ‘07 and former Stag Matt Bocklet of the Denver Outlaws defeated the New York Lizards, 20–17, in a Major League Lacrosse (MLL) Semi-final game. 
 In January 2020, the newly formerd Connecticut Hammerheads of the MLL announced that Rafferty Stadium would be their home venue. 
 The Premier Lacrosse League is slated to host week 7 of its 2022 season at Rafferty Stadium on July 23-24, 2022.

References

External links
Conway Field at Rafferty Stadium
Rafferty Stadium
Rafferty Stadium Groundbreaking

Fairfield Stags lacrosse
Connecticut Hammerheads
Buildings and structures in Fairfield, Connecticut
College lacrosse venues in the United States
Major League Lacrosse venues
Premier Lacrosse League venues
Lacrosse venues in Connecticut
Sports venues in Fairfield County, Connecticut
2014 establishments in Connecticut
Sports venues completed in 2014